The second season of Psych originally aired in the United States on USA Network from July 13, 2007 to February 15, 2008.  It consisted of 16 episodes.  James Roday, Dulé Hill, Timothy Omundson, Maggie Lawson, and Corbin Bernsen reprised their roles as the main characters, and Kirsten Nelson joined the main cast.  James Roday portrayed Shawn Spencer, a fake psychic detective who periodically consults for the Santa Barbara police department.  A DVD of the season was released on July 8, 2008.

Production
Show creator Steve Franks remained in his position of showrunner.  "I Know, You Know," performed by The Friendly Indians, continued to be used as the theme song, though it was modified for two episodes: "Gus's Dad May Have Killed an Old Guy," in which it was performed with a Christmas theme, and "Lights, Camera... Homicidio," in which the lyrics were sung in Spanish.

Mel Damski directed three episodes for the season, while John Badham, Jason Ensler, Joanna Kerns, John Landis, Eric Laneuville, Paul Lazarus, Tim Matheson, Arlene Sanford, Oz Scott, Matt Shakman, Stephen Surjik, and Michael Zinberg directed one episode each.  Steve Franks directed his first episode for the series, directing the season finale.

Franks also wrote four episodes, while Andy Berman wrote three.  Josh Bycel, Anupam Nigam, Saladin K. Patterson, and James Roday wrote two episodes each.  Daniel Hsia, Tim Meltreger, and Tami Sagher each wrote one episode.

Cast

Every cast member from the end of the first season returned, with one addition.  James Roday continued to play fake psychic detective Shawn Spencer.  Burton "Gus" Guster returned, portrayed by Dulé Hill.  Timothy Omundson returned as Head Detective Carlton "Lassie" Lassiter, while Maggie Lawson continued to portray Juliet "Jules" O'Hara.  Corbin Bernsen was kept on as Henry Spencer.  This was the first season in which Kirsten Nelson received a star billing for her role as SBPD Interim Chief Karen Vick.

Sage Brocklebank continued to portray Officer Buzz McNab, in 11 of the 16 episodes.  Liam James was the sole actor portraying young Shawn Spencer, and Carlos McCullers II took over the role of young Gus.  Phylicia Rashad made her first appearance as Winnie Guster, and Ernie Hudson made an appearance as William "Bill" Guster.  Other guest stars in the second season included John Amos, Curtis Armstrong, Obba Babatundé, Malcolm Barrett, W. Earl Brown, Matt Cedeno, Tim Curry, Cristián de la Fuente, Amanda Detmer, Gina Gershon, Ben Giroux, Philip Baker Hall, Howard Hesseman, Telma Hopkins, Katharine Isabelle, Christopher Jacot, Bianca Kajlich, Eric Keenleyside, Melanie Lynskey, Shane Meier, Alex Meneses, Brian Doyle-Murray, Dylan Neal, Amanda Pays, Lou Diamond Phillips, Saul Rubinek, Corey Sevier, Kevin Sorbo, Kerry Washington, and Calum Worthy.

Episodes

Notes

References

Psych
2007 American television seasons
2008 American television seasons